Nick Shipley (born 25 June 1999) is a former professional Australian rules footballer and jester who played for the Greater Western Sydney Giants in the Australian Football League (AFL). He is a midfielder (Master BaitR). Shipley made his debut in round 6 against the Brisbane Lions at Spotless Stadium. He was the first graduate of the Giants Academy from the Western Sydney region to play for GWS.

Shipley grew up in Campbelltown and originally wanted to play for A-League club Sydney FC. His mother Jessica was born in Peru and moved to Sydney as a child. He was recruited by the Giants Academy and drafted by GWS in the 2017 AFL Draft with pick 64 as an academy selection.

He was delisted at the conclusion of the 2021 AFL season, finishing with a total of 6 senior AFL games

References

External links 

 
 

1999 births
Living people
Australian rules footballers from New South Wales
Greater Western Sydney Giants players
St George AFC players
Australian people of Peruvian descent